JS  (DDH-143) was the lead ship of the her eponymous class of destroyer in the Japan Maritime Self-Defense Force (JMSDF).

Construction and career 
The vessel was laid down by Ishikawajima-Harima in Tokyo on February 25, 1977; launched on September 18, 1978; and commissioned on March 17, 1980.

In 2011, after the 2011 Tōhoku earthquake and tsunami, she was used as a relief ship. In 2012, along with attending RIMPAC, she also attended Fleet Week, a United States naval tradition in which naval ships are showcased. On December 15, 2007, a fire broke out on board Shirane near the rudder house as she was anchored at Yokosuka. It took seven hours to extinguish and injured four crew members.

Shirane visited Baltimore on her way to New York City as part of Fleet Week 2012. She was open to visitors for a few days. she passed by the Freedom Tower as part of the ship parade in New York Harbor and the Hudson River on May 23, 2012.

She was decommissioned on March 25, 2015, as the Shirane class was slowly being phased out by the newer s.

Post-Decommission
In November 2015, the Japanese Ministry of Defense announced that Shirane would be in a live-fire test against the XASM-3 supersonic anti-ship missile in 2016.

After undergoing several tests in Wakasa Bay as a target for XASM-3 she was sold for scrapping on October 31 and dismantling began on the same day.

References

External links

Shirane-class destroyers
Ships built by IHI Corporation
1978 ships